Vítor Hugo Gomes da Silva (born 25 December 1987), known as Gomes, is a Portuguese professional footballer who plays for Rio Ave as a defensive midfielder.

He achieved Primeira Liga totals of 226 games and 15 goals over 11 seasons, for Rio Ave, Moreirense, Belenenses and Aves. He also played professionally in Hungary, Turkey and Cyprus.

Club career
Born in Vila do Conde and a product of hometown club Rio Ave FC's youth system, Gomes first appeared with the first team on 19 March 2006, starting in a 0–1 home loss against S.L. Benfica. In late January 2008, he began an unsuccessful loan spell at Serie A's Cagliari Calcio, making no appearances and returning to Rio Ave in July. During that season, he also played 13 matches (12 starts) as they returned to the Primeira Liga after an absence of two years.

In the following top-division campaigns, Gomes was regularly used by Rio Ave. He scored his first goals in 2009–10, against C.D. Nacional (2–0, home) and S.C. Olhanense (1–5 defeat, also at the Estádio dos Arcos).

In January 2013, Gomes joined a host of compatriots at Videoton FC, with the Hungarians making the deal permanent in early June. Two years later, he was loaned to Balıkesirspor in the Turkish Süper Lig by Moreirense FC.

Gomes continued to compete in the Portuguese top tier in the following years, with C.F. Os Belenenses and C.D. Aves. On 18 April 2018, he scored twice in a 2–1 away victory over Caldas S.C. in the semi-finals of the Taça de Portugal to take the latter club to its first ever final in the competition. He also played the full 90 minutes in the decisive match against Sporting CP, providing an assist to Alexandre Guedes in the 2–1 win in Lisbon.

On 1 October 2018, Gomes scored a hat-trick, his only goals of the season, in a 3–0 home defeat of Portimonense SC. He moved abroad again the following 2 July, on a free transfer to AC Omonia of the Cypriot First Division for two years. During his time in Nicosia, he won a league title in 2020–21.

Gomes returned to Rio Ave on 1 July 2021, signing a two-year deal with the option of a third. The team won promotion as champions in his first season back, and he scored the only goal of a home winner over title rivals Casa Pia A.C. with two games remaining.

International career
Gomes was a member of the Portugal under-20 squad at the 2007 FIFA World Cup. Later that year, in August, he received his first callup to the under-21s; he won his first and only cap for the latter on the 21st, playing the second half of the 3–0 friendly win against Malta held in his hometown.

Personal life
Gomes' older brother, José, was also a footballer. A defender, he represented several clubs, and the pair shared teams in Rio Ave (2005–06, 2009–12).

Career statistics

Honours
Aves
Taça de Portugal: 2017–18

Omonia
Cypriot First Division: 2020–21

Rio Ave
Liga Portugal 2: 2021–22

References

External links

1987 births
Living people
People from Vila do Conde
Sportspeople from Porto District
Portuguese footballers
Association football midfielders
Primeira Liga players
Liga Portugal 2 players
Rio Ave F.C. players
Moreirense F.C. players
C.F. Os Belenenses players
C.D. Aves players
Cagliari Calcio players
Nemzeti Bajnokság I players
Fehérvár FC players
Süper Lig players
Balıkesirspor footballers
Cypriot First Division players
AC Omonia players
Portugal youth international footballers
Portugal under-21 international footballers
Portuguese expatriate footballers
Expatriate footballers in Italy
Expatriate footballers in Hungary
Expatriate footballers in Turkey
Expatriate footballers in Cyprus
Portuguese expatriate sportspeople in Italy
Portuguese expatriate sportspeople in Hungary
Portuguese expatriate sportspeople in Turkey
Portuguese expatriate sportspeople in Cyprus